Boumba River is a river in the South Cameroon Plateau of southeast Cameroon.

Geography
The river rises in the Abong-Mbang region. The Boumba is almost 530 km long, and has a catchment of 27.400 km²

Hydrometrie 
The flow of the river was measured at Biwala in m³/s

Ecology 
The river is a tributary of the Dja River and is adjacent to the Boumba Bek National Park, which is located between the Boumba and the Bek River. The forested area around the river is a diverse ecosystem. Logging is an industry in the area. The remote region is home to the Baka. Communities in the area engage in subsistence farming, hunting, fishing and gathering. The area is also used illegal commercial bushmeat hunters and traders and trophy hunters. Parrots and ivory are also smuggled through the area.

Trivia 
 The area is believed to be a possible origin of the HIV virus.
 The legendary Mokèlé-mbèmbé was reportedly sighted on the river in 2000.

References

Rivers of Cameroon